Harold Joseph "Harry" Greene (February 11, 1959 – August 5, 2014) was a United States Army general who was killed during the War in Afghanistan. During his time with the United States Army, he held various commands associated with engineering and logistical support for United States and coalition troops. At the time of his death, he was deputy commanding general of Combined Security Transition Command – Afghanistan.

At the rank of major general, Greene was the highest-ranking American service member killed by hostile action since Lieutenant General Timothy Maude was killed in the September 11 attack on the Pentagon, and the highest-ranking service member killed on foreign soil during a war since Rear Admiral Rembrandt C. Robinson was killed during the Vietnam War in May 1972. To date, Greene is also the highest-ranking American officer to be killed in combat in the ongoing Global War on Terrorism.

Greene was killed at Camp Qargha, Afghanistan when a member of the Afghan National Army opened fire on a delegation of general officers and other dignitaries who were conducting an inspection tour. Fourteen NATO and Afghan service members were wounded in the attack. The attacker was killed at the scene when two NATO service members returned fire; a subsequent investigation indicated that the Afghan soldier, 22-year old Pashtun Private Rafiqullah, was motivated by unhappiness over being denied leave to travel home during the Eid al-Fitr holiday.

Early life and education
Greene was born in Boston, Massachusetts, on February 11, 1959, to Eva May Shediak (May 22, 1928 – February 15, 2013) and Harold F. Greene (born 1930). He grew up in Schenectady, New York graduated from Guilderland High School in 1977, and from Rensselaer Polytechnic Institute (RPI) with a bachelor's degree in materials engineering in 1980. Greene's father lived in Guilderland, New York at the time of his death. His mother died in February 2013. Greene received a master's degree in industrial engineering from RPI, and a master's in materials engineering from the University of Southern California (USC).  In addition, he received a master's degree in mechanical engineering from USC, and a Doctor of Philosophy (1992) in materials science, also from USC.

Greene's military education included the Engineer Officer Basic and Advanced Courses, and the United States Army Command and General Staff College. He completed the Defense Systems Management College's Advanced Program Management Course at the Defense Acquisition University, and also held a Master of Strategic Studies degree from the United States Army War College.

Career

Greene received his commission as an engineer officer in 1980, after completing Reserve Officer Training Corps at RPI.

As he worked his way through the ranks, Greene's assignments included platoon leader, company executive officer, and battalion staff officer, Fort Polk; resident engineer in Athens; project engineer in Istanbul; brigade engineer and company commander, V Corps, West Germany; staff officer and materials engineer, Army Aviation and Troop Command, St. Louis; product manager, Aerial Common Sensor, Fort Monmouth; and assistant director, Combat Developments Directorate, U.S. Army Maneuver Support Center, Fort Leonard Wood.  At the time of the September 11 attacks in 2001, he was stationed at Fort Leonard Wood.

Greene was promoted to brigadier general in late 2009, and served as deputy commanding general of United States Army Research, Development and Engineering Command at Aberdeen Proving Ground. and the commanding general of Natick Soldier Systems Center. While at Natick, Greene urged the military to incorporate smartphones, video games and virtual worlds into military training. Later, he became Program Executive Officer for Intelligence, Electronic Warfare and Sensors in the Office of the Assistant Secretary of the Army (Acquisition, Logistics and Technology).  Promoted to major general in 2012, he was Deputy for Acquisition and Systems Management in the same office. In January 2014 he was named deputy commander of Combined Security Transition Command – Afghanistan during Operation Enduring Freedom – Afghanistan.

Death

On August 5, 2014, Greene died in a fragging incident after being shot by an Afghan soldier with an M16 rifle at Camp Qargha's Marshal Fahim National Defense University in Kabul, Afghanistan. He had been making a routine visit to a training facility at the time. The Afghan National Army MP, identified as Rafiqullah, began firing from his barracks room window on Greene and about 90 other U.S. and coalition forces who were visiting the university.  Fourteen NATO and Afghan service members were wounded in the attack, including Brigadier General Michael Bartscher of the German Bundeswehr, two Afghan generals and another Afghan officer, eight Americans, and two British soldiers. The Afghan soldier was shot and killed by two NATO service members identified as one Danish and one American.

On the morning of August 7, 2014, Greene's body arrived at Dover Air Force Base in Delaware. Greene was buried in Arlington National Cemetery on August 14, 2014.

On July 10, 2015, the Town of Natick, Massachusetts renamed Kansas Street in Greene's honor. On September 25, 2015, the nine British servicemen acting as the Close Protection Team for the group were awarded the US Army Commendation Medal for their heroism in saving the lives of many others.

Personal life
Greene was married to Sue Myers, a doctor and retired colonel who worked as a professor at the U.S. Army War College in Carlisle, Pennsylvania. At the time of his death, she lived in Falls Church, Virginia. Greene had two children, a daughter, Amelia Greene, and a son, Matthew Greene, who is a U.S. Army Captain.

Awards and decorations

See also

 United States military casualties in the War in Afghanistan
 Major General Nathanael Greene

Notes

References

External links

Arlington National Cemetery

1959 births
2014 deaths
American military personnel killed in the War in Afghanistan (2001–2021)
Deaths by firearm in Afghanistan
Military personnel from New York (state)
United States Army generals
People from Boston
People from Carlisle, Pennsylvania
People from Schenectady County, New York
People from Falls Church, Virginia
Recipients of the Legion of Merit
Rensselaer Polytechnic Institute alumni
USC Viterbi School of Engineering alumni
United States Army Command and General Staff College alumni
United States Army War College alumni
Burials at Arlington National Cemetery
Recipients of the Meritorious Service Medal (United States)
United States Army personnel of the War in Afghanistan (2001–2021)
Military personnel from Pennsylvania
Military personnel from Massachusetts